Awakino is a settlement in the south of Waitomo District, in the North Island of New Zealand. It is located on State Highway 3 at the mouth of the Awakino River, five kilometres north of Mokau. It is 79 km southwest of Te Kuiti, and 98 km northeast of New Plymouth.

North of Awakino, State Highway 3 turns inland, and the coast is largely unpopulated. Beyond Awakino there are no settlements of any size on the coast south of the Kawhia Harbour.

The New Zealand Ministry for Culture and Heritage gives a translation of "bad creek" for Awakino.

The local Maniaroa Marae and meeting house are affiliated with the Ngāti Maniapoto hapū of Ngāti Rākei, Rungaterangi and Waiora.

Awakino is in meshblocks 1016500 and 1016900, which had a population of 51 people in the 2018 census.

References

Further reading

General historical works

Business history

For a summary of that archive's holding, see 

 in New Plymouth contains the letter book of the Waitara-based shipping agent, Lewis Clare (died 1960). This book records coastal shipping from and into small North Taranaki ports (including those mentioned in de Jardine's book) between 1910 and 1920. See 

 in New Plymouth contains the business records  of Gibson Coach Lines, who ran services from New Plymouth to Awakino. See

Maori

 in New Plymouth contains an essay on Riu Batley (1887–1960) (see above) and his family: researched and written by his nephew, Graeme Gummer. See 

 in New Plymouth contains a series of essays on Maori leadership: as practiced in the Mokau, Awakino, and Mahoenui areas, and on the Chatham Islands. It also covers the development of the Maori religious movement called Hauhau (or Pai Marire). This material was compiled by Graeme Gummer. See 

 in New Plymouth contains research notes and an obituary of Bella Mataroa (died 1925) who lived in Nukuhakere/Nukuhakari, half way between Marokopa and Awakino. See

People

 in New Plymouth contains an essay on Riu Batley (1887–1960) (see above) and his family: researched and written by his nephew, Graeme Gummer. See 

 in New Plymouth contains research notes and an obituary of Bella Mataroa (died 1925) who lived in Nukuhakere/Nukuhakari, half way between Marokopa and Awakino. See

Schools

Waitomo District
Populated places in Waikato